Carlo Pace (born 7 April 1978) is a retired Luxembourgian football striker.

References

1978 births
Living people
Luxembourgian footballers
FA Red Boys Differdange players
Jeunesse Esch players
Union Luxembourg players
FC Avenir Beggen players
UN Käerjéng 97 players
FC Differdange 03 players
US Rumelange players
Association football forwards
Luxembourg international footballers